A part of Beşiktaş Vişnezade Park is oriented under the name "Şairler Sofası". Şairler Sofası is the 1998 sculpture by Gürdal Duyar whose name the park goes by. The depicted characters in the sculpture as well as the figures depicted in the other sculptures in the greater park are 19th and 20th  century poets who have mostly lived in and around Beşiktaş.  In the sculpture Şairler Sofası, Duyar has composed it such that the poets are "hand in hand" and "shoulder to shoulder". It includes the poets Behçet Necatigil, Sabahattin Kudret Aksal, Cahit Sıtkı Tarancı, Oktay Rıfat, Orhan Veli, Neyzen Tevfik and Nigâr Hanım together in one composition.  The Architectural design of the park was done by Erhan İşözen. The park was opened in 1998 together with the first sculptures. at the inauguration of the park the mayor of Beşiktaş, Ayfer Atay, said that the park will be a place where books will be signed and poems will be read. The park has become a place where more poets and other members of Turkish society were honored with monuments over the years.

The Sculptures
On the inauguration of the park in 1998, the park featured sculptures by Gürdal Duyar, Yunus Tonkuş and Namık Denizhan. Later on over the years new sculptures by them, and other sculptors, have been added to the park.

Following the death of Necati Cumalı in 2001 a sculpture of Cumalı by Gürdal Duyar was added to the park in 2002. Since the initial opening of the park the sculptures of the poets Süleyman Seba by Neslihan Pala has also been added.
On 13 April 2016 the sculpture of Ataol Behramoğlu was inaugurated. It was sculpted by Ali Yaldır, Zafer Dağdeviren and Derya Ersoy.
In 2017 the sculpture of Alâeddin Yavaşça was erected.
At some point a sculpture of Cahit Külebi has also been added.

Photos

Sources

References

Parks in Istanbul
1998 sculptures
2002 sculptures
2016 sculptures
Outdoor sculptures in Turkey
Monuments and memorials in Istanbul
Sculptures of women in Turkey
Sculptures of men in Turkey
Istanbul-related lists
Events in Istanbul
Sculptures in Turkey
1998 in Turkey
Sculptures by Gürdal Duyar